TCG Sultanhisar (P-111), ex-USS PC-1638, was a  of the Turkish Navy. She was  built in 1963 by Gunderson Brothers Engineering Corp. in Portland, Oregon as a submarine chaser.

The vessel was transferred on May 9, 1964 along with two other boats of the same class to Turkey. Three other ships of the class followed the next year. Commissioned on January 25, 1965, the Sultanhisar was stationed at the Gölcük Naval Base together with other s, before they were deployed in 1977 to the naval base in Izmir.

Sultanhisar was decommissioned on June 3, 2002 as s entered service.

TCG Sultanhisar (P-111) was the third ship of the Turkish Navy to have the name, following the destroyer TCG Sultanhisar and the torpedo boat Sultanhisar.

References

Hisar-class patrol boats
1963 ships
Ships built in Portland, Oregon